Muhammad Aslam Bhutani (also sometimes written Mohammad Aslam Bhutiani) (born October 2, 1960) is a Member of the National Assembly of Pakistan. He was born in Dureji a small village of Lasbela District at Balochistan a province of Pakistan. He is the younger brother of Muhammad Saleh Bootani (caretaker Chief Minister of Balochistan). He stepped into politics in 2002.

Early life
Bootani received his early education from his native village, then moved to Hyderabad for higher education. In Hyderabad, he passed his Secondary School Certificate. He did his graduation from the Karachi University. Before joining politics he served as a Police chief, Anti-Narcotics Force and Federal Investigation Agency. On 21 May 2020, Bootani challenged the Balochistan government's decision to nominate filmmaker Javed Jabbar as Balochistan's representative at the National Finance Commission in a petition filed at the Balochistan High Court. He said he was opposed to Mr. Jabbar's appointment because neither he belonged to Balochistan nor had a background in economics.

Political career
Bhootani served as the Deputy Speaker of the Provincial Assembly of Balochistan for five years. He also served as the Speaker of the Provincial Assembly of Balochistan from 8 April 2008 to 25 December 2012. In the 2018 Pakistani general election, he won NA-272 (Lasbela-cum-Gwadar) defeating the leaders of two political parties: Jam Kamal Khan of the Balochistan Awami Party and Akhtar Mengal of the Balochistan National Party. He won MNA election in 2018 election for seat NA-272 after obtaining 70,000 votes which was the highest number of votes in Balochistan. Bhootani is known for his criticism of the China-Pakistan Economic Corridor as he has insisted that the people of Gwadar, his electoral constituency do not currently benefit from the fruits of the multi-billion project.

References

1960 births
Living people
Baloch people
People from Lasbela District
University of Karachi alumni
Pakistani MNAs 2018–2023